Mozart on Tour is a 1991 documentary about the life and music of Wolfgang Amadeus Mozart (1756–1791) that focuses on his travels and how his music developed through them.

Cast
André Previn...Host and narrator
Michael Kitchen...Reader of Mozart′s letters

Synopsis
Wolfgang Amadeus Mozart spent a third of his life travelling, and Mozart on Tour focuses on these journeys and their influence on his life and work, highlighting a piano concerto that demonstrates his musical development at the time of each trip.

The first half of each episode of Mozart on Tour is a documentary hosted by André Previn, who provides a narrative in an even and subdued tone describing a journey Mozart made, emphasizing its influence on his musical development and events in his personal and professional life. The documentary includes footage of historic sites relevant to Mozart′s journey as they appeared when the documentary was filmed, actors in period costume portraying – without dialogue – events Previn describes, and musicians performing portions of Mozart′s compositions. Actor Michael Kitchen appears frequently, seated and dressed casually in modern clothing, to recite portions of Mozart′s letters directly to the camera in a conversational tone, while other actors provide uncredited off-camera readings of letters by other people in Mozart′s life.  The second half of each episode is devoted to the complete performance in concert of a Mozart piano concerto – in one episode to two early piano concertos – related to the journey described in the episode.

Production

Mozart on Tour was produced to coincide with the 1991 bicentennial of Mozart′s death. The entire 13-part series was broadcast in Europe, while in the United States a two-hour version of the series aired as a single episode on PBS in December 1991.

Episodes

References

External links
IMDb Mozart on Tour (1984-1990)
Promotional video for Mozart on Tour on YouTube
Promotional video for Mozart on Tour on YouTube
Mozart on Tour episode "Paris: Far from Salzburg" at Daily Motion
Michael Kitchen in Mozart on Tour — Episode 3
Michael Kitchen in Mozart on Tour — Episode 4
Michael Kitchen in Mozart on Tour — Episode 5

Cultural depictions of Wolfgang Amadeus Mozart
Documentary television series about historical events
Documentary television series about music
1991 television series debuts
1991 television series endings